Church of Santa Bárbara may refer to:

 Church of Santa Bárbara (Vila do Porto), municipality of Vila do Porto, the Azores
 Church of Santa Bárbara (Horta), municipality of Horta, the Azores